Peter Goers  is a South Australian amateur actor, director, critic, columnist and current host of the radio program The Evening Show on ABC Radio Adelaide, which broadcasts throughout South Australia and to the "Silver" city of Broken Hill. His career has spanned over 40 years in the entertainment industry across a range of different mediums and formats including television, print, radio and theatre, and he is frequently engaged as a guest speaker. In the Australia Day Honours, 2013, Goers was awarded the Medal of the Order of Australia (OAM) for his "service to the community as a radio broadcaster".

Personal life 

Goers was born in Adelaide, raised in Woodville South and educated at both Woodville Primary and Findon High schools. Goers is a fifth-generation Australian of German and Irish descent. An influence in Goers' early life was teacher and former South Adelaide footballer Mick Rivers, who encouraged his interest in acting. Upon completion of his secondary schooling, Goers studied arts at Flinders University for eight years.

On 9 July 1982, both his parents were killed in a plane accident involving Pan Am Flight 759 which crashed shortly after takeoff from New Orleans, USA.

Career 

In 1983, Goers started reviewing films for radio host Carole Whitelock on the then-named 5AN for the ABC, which led to commercial contracts, including 5DN and ten years at the Austereo Radio Network.

Goers worked as full-time historian of the Performing Arts Collection of South Australia with the South Australian director Colin Ballantyne. Having debuted as the Artful Dodger in Oliver! at the Woodville Town Hall in 1972, Goers has been involved in many amateur theatre companies in Adelaide as an actor and director, including as artistic director of the University of Adelaide Theatre Guild (1982–86), and with Jimmy Zoole Presents, Q Theatre Company and Adelaide Repertory Theatre. He won an "Advertiser" Fringe Award , and he is the only director with four plays in Adelaide on one night – in interlocking seasons. 

During the same period, Jason Daniel, an arts editor for The Advertiser, had heard Goers' movie reviews and suggested that he also review theatre for the newspaper, which he did from 1985 to 1996. He became known as 'the critic that ate Adelaide'. While with The Advertiser he began writing an opinion column for the associated Sunday Mail in 1991. In 1986 he was abused by Fringe comedian Wendy Harmer during her show after providing a bad review, had his glasses broken, was spat on, and his notebook was taken and thrown at him.

Goers also hosted horror movies on Channel Ten Adelaide during the 1980s.

Mid career 

In 1996 Goers left Adelaide and moved to Istanbul in Turkey. There he found work in theatre, working as a producer on local productions, before taking up a post as an English lecturer at a local university. While there he opened a new drama department and became the university's Dean of Drama. He also returned to theatre reviewing, writing English-language reviews for a local paper.

Goers returned to Adelaide in 1998 and to News Limited's Sunday Mail as a regular columnist. The following year saw his return to local radio, with a Monday night slot on the commercial radio station FIVEaa. Two months later he was joined by Rex Jory and Pamela Francis to produce The Good, the Bad and the Ugly as a weekly panel, which soon expanded to a twice-weekly show with the addition of Alex Ward. Nevertheless, the show was to have a short life, and by early November of that year it had ended its run.

The ABC 

In 2003, Goers was invited to audition for the ABC. However, on the day when he was due to audition, Goers was requested by the management to fill in for Carole Whitelock, who had taken ill. This led to a return to radio on the ABC when he hosted the evening session for the station over the 2003/2004 summer break. From there he went on to host The Evening Show on a permanent basis.

The Evening Show features on 891 ABC Adelaide from 7:00 pm on weekdays and is presented in a magazine format, with Goers interviewing local, national and international celebrities and academics in addition to a regular call-back segment and a quiz. The show includes the only regular children's programming on ABC radio, the Kids Quiz, each Thursday evening. Goers also has several regular guests, including his Goers' Gals, Nick Prescott discussing film, and linguist Roly Sussex discussing the evolution of the English language.

Goers begins his show with "Hi ho, everybody", a line borrowed from Jack Davey and at the end of every show, Goers signs off with the line "Goodnight Mrs Calabash, wherever you are" – borrowed from Jimmy Durante.

Since 2019, Goers has presented Sunday Mornings from 10am til midday. The first hour of the show known as Smart Arts, is dedicated to covering South Australian arts, with critics Samela Harris and Steve Davis joining each week to discuss the week in the local arts scene. The second hour features talkback gardening with Goers joined by Sophie Thompson.

Religious views

Goers was raised Methodist and has described himself as a Christian and also "a bit of an agnostic as are all reasonable people of reasonable faith. None of us knows if there is a God, but there's always hope." In an article encouraging tolerance between New Atheists and Christians, Goers was extremely critical of atheism. Regarding Islam, Goers has stated "Muslims do not proselytise and some of the best Christians I've ever known are Muslims." Goers was critical of religious arguments against Same Sex Marriage and vocal in support of the "Yes" campaign during the Australian Marriage Law Postal Survey.

Football views
Goers is a passionate and vocal supporter of the Port Adelaide Football Club in the Australian Football League (AFL).

References

External links 
 891 Evenings with Peter Goers (Official site)

Australian radio personalities
People from Adelaide
1956 births
Living people
Recipients of the Medal of the Order of Australia
Journalists from South Australia
Former Methodists